Abbie Kamin is a Houston politician that represents District C in the Houston City Council.

Personal life
Kamin's grandparents owned a store in District C, and her father is a small business owner. She attended The Emery/Weiner School in Houston. She is a civil rights attorney, and attended Tulane University.

Political career
Kamin was sworn in to represent District C of the Houston City Council on January 2, 2020. She is a member of the Mayors Commission Against Gun Violence. Kamin is affiliated with the Democratic Party. On the issue of abortion, Kamin agrees that abortion should be legal and believes programs such as Medicaid and Medicare should pay for abortion procedures.

References

Tulane University alumni
Texas Democrats
Houston City Council members
Living people
Year of birth missing (living people)
American civil rights lawyers
Women city councillors in Texas
21st-century American women